Sophie Robinson may refer to:
 Sophie Robinson (poet) (born 1985), English poet and teacher
 Sophie Robinson (designer) ( 2000–present), British interior stylist, designer and journalist